The Man with the Magic Box is a 2017 science fiction dystopia thriller film written and directed by Polish film director  Bodo Kox. The film is set in 2030 of Orwellian Poland and involves elements of time travel to the times of Communist Poland of 1950s.

Cast 

 Olga Bołądź -- Goria
 Piotr Polak -- Adam
 Sebastian Stankiewicz -- Sebastian
 Helena Norowicz -- Urszula Stefanka
 Wojciech Zielinski -- Agent Jan Tragosz
 Bartlomiej Firlet -- Kowalsky Radzimir
 Bartosz Cao --  Son of Prol
 Anna Konieczna -- Agent Maria Torunska
 Agata Buzek -- Doctor
 Arkadiusz Jakubik -- Emfazy Stefanski
 Bogdan Koca -- Prol Collector
 Roma Kox -- Young Urszula Stefanska
 Bartosz Bielenia -- Bibi
 Bartosz Adamczyk -- Assistant Heniek
 Kamil Tolinski -- Assistant Stanislaw

Awards
2017: Asteroide award of the international Trieste Science+Fiction Festival
2017: Award for music at the Gdynia Film Festival, Poland 
2017: GreenBox award at the Bluebox Film Festival, Olsztyn, Poland

References

2010s science fiction films
2017 films
Films about time travel
Dystopian films
Films produced by Anna Wasniewska-Gill